Norman Swartz (born 1939) is an American philosopher and professor emeritus (retired 1998) of philosophy, Simon Fraser University. He is the author or co-author of multiple books and multiple articles on the Internet Encyclopedia of Philosophy. He earned a B.A. in physics from Harvard University in 1961, an M.A. in history and philosophy of science from Indiana University in 1965 and a Ph.D. in history of philosophy of science in 1971 also from Indiana University. He uses the term physical law to mean the laws of nature as they truly are and not as they are inferred and described in the practice of science.

Publications
Following is an incomplete list of publications.
 Definitions, Dictionaries, and Meanings (1997, revised 2010)

Books
 Possible Worlds: An Introduction to Logic and Its Philosophy. Co-authored with Raymond Bradley. (Indianapolis: Hackett), 1979.
 The Concept of Physical Law. (New York: Cambridge University Press), 1985.
 Beyond Experience: Metaphysical Theories and Philosophical Constraints. (Toronto: University of Toronto Press), 1991.

Articles on the Internet Encyclopedia of Philosophy
 Laws of Nature
 Truth
 Foreknowledge and Free Will

References

External links
 A search for "Norman Swartz" on Philpapers.org.

American philosophers
Living people
Academic staff of Simon Fraser University
Harvard University alumni
Indiana University alumni
1939 births